France an Ode was written by Samuel Coleridge in April 1798. The poem describes his development from supporting the French Revolution to his feelings of betrayal when they invaded Switzerland. Like other poems by Coleridge, it connects his political views with his religious thoughts. The Gothic elements of the poem connect the poem's style to many of his early poetic works.

Background
Coleridge was an early supporter of the French Revolution and an opponent of the British Prime Minister William Pitt. However, France's invasion of Switzerland caused him to lose faith in the revolutionaries' cause during April 1798. Although Coleridge opposed Pitt, he supported Britain and the British cause when France threatened to invade Britain by writing a poem originally titled The Recantation: An Ode, which was later renamed France: An Ode. The poem was published in the 16 April 1798 Morning Post (see 1798 in poetry). Alongside the poem was a note from Daniel Stuart, the paper's editor, which stated that, like Coleridge, the paper also switched its position on France: "The following excellent Ode will be in unison with the feelings of every friend to Liberty and foe to Oppression; of all who, admiring the French Revolution, detest and deplore the conduct of France towards Switzerland."

Soon after, the poem was published in a small work containing his other poems Frost at Midnight and Fears in Solitude under the title France: An Ode to sound more neutral. The poems were published in order with Fears in Solitude first and Frost at Midnight last to position the public poem, France: An Ode, in between two conversation poems. It was eventually reprinted by Stuart in October 1802 along with an edited version of Fears in Solitude. Of his poems, Coleridge did not like France: An Ode for what it revealed about him politically. Robert Southey, Coleridge's friend, mentioned in a letter in May 1799: "Coleridge's 'Ode upon France' is printed in the Spirit of the Public Journals under the title of 'the Recantation.' How will he like this, and how will they like it who do not allow it to be a recantation?"

In a 1799 review in the New London Review, an anonymous reviewer claimed that Coleridge plagiarised lines from Samson Agonistes when he referenced John Milton's poem in lines 53 and 54 of the poem. Later, Thomas DeQuincey made this same argument in an 1834 review for Taits Edinburgh Magazine. William Wordsworth noted that the allusion to Samson Agonistes was intentional, but it is possible that "insupportably advancing" was changed to "irresistibly advancing" in a later edition to hide the allusion.

Poem
The poem begins by describing the narrator's feelings about liberty:

Then the poem describes France at the beginning of the revolution. The image, a combination of giant and child, is commonly quoted in political works:

The poem then criticises Britain for joining tyrannous governments in opposing France:

When France entered into the Reign of Terror, the narrator describes it as necessary. However, the supporters of France were still terrified by the violence while they hoped that liberty would come:

Then the narrator describes the betrayal he suffered as France invaded Switzerland:

Themes
A main focus of France: An Ode is Coleridge's feelings over France's invasion of Switzerland. The invasion marked when France became a threat to other nations. When positioned between Fears in Solitude and Frost at Midnight, shows the development of Coleridge's feelings from youth. It describes how he viewed each stage of the revolution, from hope to horror, and how it caused him to turn from his contemporary politics while still defending liberty.

The poem, like other poems by Coleridge, connects his political views with his religious ideas. Many of the images that he uses to describe the French Revolution are connected to the Book of Revelation. Religious Musings shows an early version of the idea that was later developed in France: An Ode. Coleridge's interpretation involves a Golden Age that is in a distant future, and that he can only spend his time thinking about what the future would hold. The Gothic elements of the poem connect it to many of his other works, including Ancient Mariner, "Ballad of the Dark Ladie", Fears in Solitude, Frost at Midnight, The Nightingale, "Three Graves", and "Wanderings of Cain".

Notes

References
 Ashton, Rosemary. The Life of Samuel Taylor Coleridge. Oxford: Blackwell, 1997.
 
 Holmes, Richard. Coleridge. New York: Pantheon Books, 1989.
 Mays, J. C. C. (editor). The Collected Works of Samuel Taylor Coleridge: Poetical Works Vol I.I. Princeton: Princeton University Press, 2001.

1798 poems
Christian poetry
Poetry by Samuel Taylor Coleridge